Chandan is a village in Jaisalmer district from Indian state in Rajasthan.

References

Villages in Jaisalmer district